"Risin' to the Top" is a song by former Five Stairsteps member Keni Burke. Released in 1982 from the Changes album, it became his most successful hit as a solo artist, peaking at number 63 on the [[Hot R&B/Hip-Hop Songs|Billboard R&B charts]] and is considered Burke's signature song.

Since its 1982 release, the song has been sampled extensively in R&B and hip-hop songs, most notably the following year in the Mary Jane Girls song "All Night Long". The song appears in the 2006 video game Grand Theft Auto: Vice City Stories '' in the fictional radio station VCFL.

Track listing
  "Risin' to the Top" (Stereo) – 5:16   
  "Risin' to the Top" (Acoustic Mix) – 5:56   
  "Risin' to the Top" (Instrumental) – 5:02

Chart performance

References

External links
Keni Burke's Rising to the Top Discogs page

1982 singles
1982 songs